Newton Requa Russell (June 25, 1927 – May 18, 2013) was an American businessman and politician.

Born in Los Angeles, California, Russell attended Los Angeles High School and the Webb School of California. He served in the United States Navy during World War II. He then graduated from University of Southern California and was a special agent for Northwestern Mutual Life Insurance for twelve years. He served in the California State Assembly from 1964 to 1974 as a Republican representing the 62nd district, but following reapportionment his district was merged, and he lost his seat to fellow Republican Michael D. Antonovich in the 1974 primaries. However, a resignation that year led to a vacancy in the California State Senate for the 21st district, and Russell defeated Arthur K. Snyder in the resulting special election. He was chairman of the Senate Public Employment and Retirement Committee, and remained a member of the Senate until 1996. He died of lung cancer at his home in La Cañada Flintridge, California in 2013.

References

External links

1927 births
2013 deaths
United States Navy personnel of World War II
Politicians from Los Angeles
University of Southern California alumni
Businesspeople from Los Angeles
Republican Party members of the California State Assembly
Republican Party California state senators
People from La Cañada Flintridge, California
Deaths from lung cancer in California
20th-century American businesspeople